Earl Patrick Gorman (May 20, 1896 – August 1969) was an American football guard and tackle for the Racine Legion and for the Kenosha Maroons of the National Football League (NFL).

Biography
Gorman was born on May 20, 1896, in Chicago, Illinois. He died in 1969 in Plainfield, New Jersey.

References

1896 births
1962 deaths
Players of American football from Wisconsin
American football guards
Racine Legion players
Kenosha Maroons players